Amory may refer to:

Places
Amory, Mississippi
Amory Lock
Amory School District
Amory-Ticknor House, Boston
Amory Hall (Boston)
Vance W. Amory International Airport, island of Nevis

Other uses
Amory Adventure Award, a Canadian Venturer award
The Amory Wars, a science fiction comic book series

See also
Amory (name)